The Trobriand Islands rain forests are a tropical moist broadleaf forest ecoregion of southeastern Papua New Guinea.

 

The islands of this ecoregion have been separated from mainland New Guinea since the Late Pleistocene, and much of the biota is unique, including four mammal species and two birds-of-paradise plant species.

Geography
The ecoregion includes several island groups lying east of the eastern peninsula of the island of New Guinea, within Milne Bay Province, including the d'Entrecasteaux Islands and Trobriand Islands archipelagoes, and Woodlark Island. The largest portion of the ecoregion and the nearest to the New Guinea mainland is made up of three principal islands of the d'Entrecasteaux group: Goodenough Island, Fergusson Island, and Normanby Island.

Flora
The Trobriand Islands and Woodlark Island consist primarily of lowland rain forest on limestone substrates. Goodenough, Fergusson, and Normanby Islands consist mainly of lowland rain forest on acid soil.

The major rain forest tree genera include Pometia, Octomeles, Alstonia, Campnosperma, Canarium, Dracontomelon, Pterocymbium, Cryptocarya, Intsia, Ficus, and Terminalia.
Tree species include:
Alstonia breviloba
Alstonia rubiginosa
Canarium vitiense
Dracontomelon dao
Intsia bijuga
Octomeles sumatrana
Pometia pinnata
Terminalia catappa

Fauna
Animal species native to the ecoregion include:
Echymipera davidi
Phalanger lullulae 
Dorcopsis atrata 
Dactylopsila tatei
Nyctimene major 
Kerivoula agnella
Pipistrellus collinus 
Chiruromys forbesi
Greater tree mouse
Island tube-nosed fruit bat
Woodlark Cuscus

The ecoregion corresponds to the D'Entrecasteaux and Trobriand Islands endemic bird area. There are two endemic bird-of-paradise species, the curl-crested manucode (Manucodia comrii) and Goldie's bird-of-paradise (Paradisaea decora).

Conservation and threats
The main threats to the ecoregion include logging by foreign companies and conversion of habitat into agricultural lands.

References

External links
 

Australasian ecoregions
d'Entrecasteaux Islands 
Ecoregions of Papua New Guinea

Trobiand
Geography of Milne Bay Province
Trobriand Islands
Tropical and subtropical moist broadleaf forests
Woodlark Islands
Endemic Bird Areas